Antonio González (born 13 July 1956) is a Cuban former javelin thrower. He was a silver medallist at the 1979 Pan American Games (behind winner Duncan Atwood by only four centimetres) and was bronze medallist at the 1979 IAAF World Cup.

He won his first international medal as a teenager, taking the silver behind compatriot Reinaldo Patterson at the 1975 Central American and Caribbean Championships in Athletics. He returned four years later to take the bronze medal.

International competitions

See also
List of Pan American Games medalists in athletics (men)

References

Living people
1956 births
Cuban male javelin throwers
Pan American Games medalists in athletics (track and field)
Pan American Games silver medalists for Cuba
Athletes (track and field) at the 1979 Pan American Games
Competitors at the 1978 Central American and Caribbean Games
Competitors at the 1982 Central American and Caribbean Games
Central American and Caribbean Games gold medalists for Cuba
Central American and Caribbean Games bronze medalists for Cuba
Central American and Caribbean Games medalists in athletics
Medalists at the 1979 Pan American Games
20th-century Cuban people